The House of Arenberg is an aristocratic lineage that is constituted by three successive families that took their name from Arenberg, a small territory of the Holy Roman Empire in the Eifel region. The inheritance of the House of Croÿ-Aarschot made the Arenbergs the wealthiest and most influential noble family of the Habsburg Netherlands. The family's Duchy of Arenberg was mediatized in 1810.

The current head of the house bears the title of Duke of Arenberg, while all other members are princes or princesses. They all enjoy the style of Serene Highness.

In 1827 Prince Pierre d'Arenberg, third son of the 6th Duke of Arenberg, was made a Peer of France and his descendants are now a French branch of the family (French Dukes and Peers).

Lords of Arenberg

Counts of Arenberg

Princely Counts and later Dukes of Arenberg 

The marriage contract in 1547 between Margaret de la Marck, Countess of Arenberg, and Jean de Ligne-Barbançon stipulated that their offspring would abandon the name of Ligne (to which house they belonged) and adopt the name and arms of Arenberg. On 5 March 1576, Emperor Maximilian II raised Margaret and her son Charles to the rank of Princely Count (German: Gefürstete Graf). As such, the Arenbergs sat and voted on the bench of secular princes in the Imperial Diet. On 9 June 1644, Emperor Ferdinand III bestowed the title of Duke of Arenberg on Charles' grandsons, Philip-Francis and Charles-Eugene, as well as to all legitimate descendants of Charles and his brother Robert of Arenberg, prince of Barbançon.

Meanwhile, the marriage of Princely Count Charles to Anne de Croÿ, the sister and heiress of the last Croÿ Duke of Aarschot, had brought the Arenbergs a series of titles, as well as vast estates in the Habsburg Netherlands in 1612. The senior title was that of Duke of Aarschot. It had been created in 1534, it was the first (and until 1627 the only) ducal title in the Netherlands, and it carried the dignity of a Spanish Grandee. The lands of the Arenbergs gave them a seat in the second estate of the Provincial States of Brabant and of Hainaut. 

Since the Arenbergs were now indisputably first amongst the nobility of the Habsburg Netherlands, it became customary for the Dukes to receive the Order of the Golden Fleece shortly after their succession to the title. Staunch supporters of the Habsburgs, they held high offices at the Court of Brussels, sat on the Counsel of State, were employed on embassies (notably the embassy to King James I of England that negotiated the Treaty of London of 1604) and acted as provincial governors in Hainaut and the Franche-Comté. Occupying high military commands could likewise be called something like their birthright.

In 1605, Charles d'Arenberg and Anne de Croÿ bought the Land of Enghien of King Henry IV of France, and they made it their principal seat in the Netherlands. Initially inspired by the example set by Robert Cecil at Theobalds House, the Arenbergs created gardens at Enghien that came to enjoy an international reputation. In testimony of the patronage given to the Capuchins, the order's convent at Enghien became the necropolis of the Arenbergs. 

With the Duchy of Aarschot came the secondary country seat of Heverlee and the vast forest of Meerdaal. In keeping with their high status, the Dukes also owned a residence in Brussels. After its destruction in the bombardment of 1695, the Dukes had to settle for rented accommodation until acquiring the stately Egmont Palace in 1754. It was to remain in the family's possession until 1918. 

During the War of the First Coalition, the House of Arenberg lost its territories on the Left Bank of the Rhine. In 1803, Louis Engelbert, 6th Duke of Arenberg, was compensated with Recklinghausen and Meppen in Germany, and in 1806 also with the county of Dülmen, together named the Duchy of Arenberg. In 1810, Napoleon occupied it; in 1815, the Congress of Vienna returned it at first but then mediatized Meppen in favor of the Kingdom of Hanover and Recklinghausen in favor of the Kingdom of Prussia. The Arenbergs received the rights and rank of a mediatized house. 

Duke Engelbert-Marie (1872-1949) acquired Schloss Nordkirchen in 1903, but was expropriated (or forced to sell) his vast property in Belgium after World War I, due to his service as an officer in the Prussian army. His German property was inherited by his three children, and major parts of it were granted to a charitable trust in 1989 by his daughter-in-law, Duchess Mathildis née Calley.

Gallery

List of Heads of the House of Arenberg

See also
 List of noble families in Belgium
 Mediatised houses

Notes

References 
 Franz Josef Heyen, ed. Die Arenberger in der Eifel (Koblenz, 1987).
 Franz Josef Heyen, ed. Die Arenberger in Westfalen und Emsland (Koblenz, 1990).
 Marc Derez, a.o., eds. Arenberg in de Lage Landen: Een hoogadellijk huis in Vlaanderen en Nederland (Louvain, 2002).
 Marie Cornaz. The Dukes of Arenberg and Music in the Eighteenth Century. The Story of a Music Collection (Brepols, Turnhout, 2015).

External links  

Arenberg Foundation website
Arenberg Foundation – History of the House of Arenberg
European Heraldry – Arenberg coat of arms

Noble families of the Holy Roman Empire